The Moscow legislative election of 2005 were held December 4 of that year to the fourth convocation of the Moscow City Duma. On party lists were elected 18 of the 35 deputies, 17 deputies were in single-member constituencies. To get into the City Duma parties need to overcome the 10% threshold. The term of office of the new City Duma was four years.

Results
First place in the voting by party lists took United Russia, which received 47.25% of the vote (13 seats). 10-percent barrier to overcome two other parties, the Communist Party (16.75%, 4 seats) and United Democrats who participated in the elections under the banner of Yabloko (11.11%, 3 mandates).

Parties which did not pass 10% threshold:

LDPR - 8% 
Russian Party of Life - 4.77% 
Green Party - 2.64% 
Free Russia - 2.2% 
Social Justice Party - 1.22% 
Narodnaya Volya - 0.6%.

United Russia also won all 15 single-member districts. Thus, the party won 28 seats out of 35. List of United Russia party headed by the mayor of Moscow, Yuri Luzhkov, who helped them to improve the results in Moscow compared to the 2003 Duma elections (in December 2003 United Russia received 34.43% of the vote).

References

Legislative elections in Moscow
2005 elections in Russia
2005 in Moscow